William (4 July 1535 – 20 August 1592), called William the Younger, was Duke of Brunswick-Lüneburg and Prince of Lüneburg from 1559 until his death. Until 1569 he ruled together with his brother, Henry of Dannenberg.

William was the son of Ernest I, Duke of Brunswick-Lüneburg. On 12 October 1561 he married Dorothea of Denmark (29 June 1546 Kolding–6 January 1617 Winsen), daughter of Christian III of Denmark and Dorothea of Saxe-Lauenburg.

In 1582, William began suffering from fits of insanity. These fits caused his wife to flee him in 1584 for her own safety.

After William's death, his wife became regent for their son George.

Children that reached adulthood
 Sophie of Brunswick-Lüneburg (30 October 1563 – 1639); married George Frederick, Margrave of Brandenburg-Ansbach.
 Ernest II, Duke of Brunswick-Lüneburg (31 December 1564 – 2 March 1611); Prince of Lüneburg from 1592–1611.
 Elisabeth of Brunswick-Lüneburg (19 October 1565 – 17 July 1621); married Frederick, Count of Hohenlohe-Langenburg.
 Christian, Duke of Brunswick-Lüneburg (19 November 1566 – 8 November 1633); Prince of Lüneburg from 1611–1633.
 Augustus the Elder, Duke of Brunswick-Lüneburg (18 November 1568 – 1 October 1636); Prince of Lüneburg from 1633–1636.
 Dorothea of Brunswick-Lüneburg (1 January 1570 – 15 August 1649); married Charles I, Count Palatine of Zweibrücken-Birkenfeld.
 Clara of Brunswick-Lüneburg (16 January 1571 – 18 July 1658); married William, Count of Schwarzburg-Blankenburg.
 Anne Ursula of Brunswick-Lüneburg (22 March 1572 – 5 February 1601)
 Margaret of Brunswick-Lüneburg (6 April 1573 – 7 August 1643); married John Casimir, Duke of Saxe-Coburg.
 Frederick IV, Duke of Brunswick-Lüneburg (28 August 1574 – 10 December 1648); Prince of Lüneburg from 1636–1648.
 Marie of Brunswick-Lüneburg (21 October 1575 – 8 August 1610)
 Magnus of Brunswick-Lüneburg (30 August 1577 – 10 February 1632)
 George, Duke of Brunswick-Lüneburg (17 February 1582 – 12 April 1641); Prince of Calenberg 1635–1641
 John of Brunswick-Lüneburg (23 June 1583 – 27 November 1628)
 Sybille of Brunswick-Lüneburg (3 June 1584 – 5 August 1652); married Julius Ernest, Duke of Brunswick-Lüneburg.

Ancestors

Dukes of Brunswick-Lüneburg
1535 births
1592 deaths
Middle House of Lüneburg
New House of Lüneburg